Hunyad (today mainly Hunedoara) was an administrative county (comitatus) of the Kingdom of Hungary, of the Eastern Hungarian Kingdom and of the Principality of Transylvania. Its territory is now in Romania in Transylvania. The capital of the county was Déva (present-day Deva).

Geography

After 1876, Hunyad county shared borders with Romania and the Hungarian counties Krassó-Szörény, Arad, Torda-Aranyos, Alsó-Fehér and Szeben. Its area was 7,809 km2 around 1910.

Etymology
The toponym Hunyad most likely comes from the Hungarian  verb, meaning 'to close' or 'to die'. According to linguist Géza Kuun, the name may keep the memory of the Huns.

History

The first known civilization living on the territory were the Scythian Agathyrsi and Sigynnae. Later the Dacians under their leader Burebista established solid control over the territory, but were conquered and massacred by the Roman Empire. Hunyad was part of Roman Dacia for a short time, but by the 3rd century it was occupied by the Goths, later by the Vandals and Gepids. The nomadic Avars conquered Transylvania in 567, and remained the ethnic majority even after the collapse of their khaganate. The Igech, Szerekes, Andos and Zeyk noble families are all of Avar origin, along with the name of the river Zsil.

Hunyad county was formed in the Middle Ages. It was first attested in 1265 as Hungnod by the Papal Quitrent Register. In 1876, when the administrative structure of Transylvania was changed, its territory was modified to include about two thirds of the former Zaránd County (Brád/Brad and Körösbánya/Baia de Criș districts) and the Saxon seat of Broos/Orăștie. In 1920, by the Treaty of Trianon, the county became part of Romania. Most of its territory lies in the present Romanian county Hunedoara; a strip in the east is now part of Alba and a strip in the west is now part of Caraș-Severin County (the commune Băuţar).

Demographics

Subdivisions

In the early 20th century, the subdivisions of Hunyad County were:

Notes

References 

States and territories established in 1265
States and territories disestablished in 1920
Kingdom of Hungary counties in Transylvania